Leftwinger of left winger may refer to:

 Left winger, a position in football
 Left-Winger (comics), a Marvel Comics character
 A person who holds left-wing political views